Higher and Higher may refer to:

Film and theater
 Higher and Higher (musical), a 1940 Broadway musical
 Higher and Higher (film), a 1943 film adaptation of the musical

Music

Albums
 Higher and Higher: The Best of Heaven 17, 1993
 Higher & Higher, by Jimmy Cliff, 1996

Songs
 "Higher & Higher" (The Blackout song), 2011
 "Higher & Higher" (DJ Jurgen song), 2000
 "Higher and Higher" (The Moody Blues song), 1969
 "(Your Love Keeps Lifting Me) Higher and Higher", by Jackie Wilson, 1967; covered by Rita Coolidge, 1977
 "Higher and Higher", by Dirty Heads from Home – Phantoms of Summer, 2013
 "Higher and Higher", by Galactic from Into the Deep, 2015
 "Higher & Higher", by Milk & Sugar, 2000

See also
 Higher, Higher (disambiguation)